Strings 'n' Stripes is the second album released by The Baseballs, a German rock 'n' roll cover band, in 2011. The album was released in April 2011.

Track listing

Chart performance

Weekly charts

Year-end charts

References

2011 albums
The Baseballs albums
Covers albums